This is a list of catastrophic collapses of broadcast masts and towers.

Masts and towers can collapse as a result of natural disasters, such as storms and fires; from engineering defects; and from accidents, sabotage and bendover.


List of collapses

References

Antennas (radio)

History of structural engineering